Langenbach may refer to the following places in Germany:

Langenbach, Bavaria, a municipality in the district of Freising, Bavaria
Langenbach station, railway station of Langenbach, Bavaria
Langenbach, Kusel, a municipality in the district of Kusel, Rhineland-Palatinate
Langenbach bei Kirburg, a municipality in the district Westerwaldkreis, Rhineland-Palatinate
Langenbach (Eichelbach), a river of Hesse, tributary of the Eichelbach